This is a list of episodes for the animated Adult Swim television series, The Brak Show. The series ran from September 2, 2001, to December 31, 2003. On May 24, 2007, an additional 5-minute webisode entitled "Space Adventure" was released on Adult Swim Video, no further webisodes have ever been produced.

The first fourteen episodes were released on the Volume One DVD on February 1, 2005, and the remaining episodes were released on the Volume Two DVD on August 8, 2006. In addition to being available on DVD, The Brak Show is also available on iTunes. The webisode was never made available for purchase, and was only available on Adult Swim Video until it was taken down in the 2010s.

Series overview

Episodes

Season 1 (2001)

Season 2 (2002)

Season 3 (2003)

Webisode (2007)

External links
 
 

Lists of American adult animated television series episodes
Lists of American sitcom episodes
The Brak Show